Euchrysops sagba, the Sagba Mountain Cupid, is a butterfly in the family Lycaenidae. It is found in eastern Nigeria, Cameroon and the Central African Republic. The habitat consists of submontane grassland.

References

Butterflies described in 1993
Euchrysops